Villingen-Schwenningen (Low Alemannic: Villinge-Schwenninge) is a city in the Schwarzwald-Baar district in southern Baden-Württemberg, Germany. It has 88,622 inhabitants (as of March 2023).

History

In the Middle Ages, Villingen was a town under Austrian lordship. During the Protestant Reformation it remained Catholic. Villingen came to international attention when it was besieged by Marshal of France Camille d'Hostun, duc de Tallard on 17 July 1704. Colonel Von Wilstorff put up a stout defence of the outdated fortifications, and after six days the siege failed.

Schwenningen remained a village until the 19th century. In 1858, the first watch factory was established, and watchmaking and precision mechanics have been important industries ever since. The town styled itself "the greatest watch city in the world" at one time, and the Kienzle Uhren watchmaking company was founded there in 1822 and remained until moving to Hamburg in 2002. The Museum of Clockmaking celebrates the town's clock and watchmaking history.

As part of the Baden-Württemberg territorial reform of 1972, Villingen and Schwenningen were merged with a number of surrounding villages to form the city of Villingen-Schwenningen. Nevertheless, the two halves of the city are separated by a plateau and remain distinct. Villingen is a former part of Baden, while Schwenningen is a former part of Württemberg.

Villingen is a major center of German carnival celebrations. The traditional Narros represent the old citizens of Villingen: Alt Villingere, Morbili, Narro, Suribbel.

Geography
The source of the River Neckar is in Schwenningen (Schwenninger Moos) whereas Villingen is traversed by the river Brigach which is the shorter one of the two headstreams of the Danube.

Boroughs

 Villingen
 Villingen
 Pfaffenweiler
 Marbach
 Tannheim
 Rietheim
 Herzogenweiler

 Schwenningen
 Schwenningen
 Obereschach
 Weigheim
 Weilersbach
 Mühlhausen

Mayors and Lord mayors

Villingen
 1912–1930: Guido Lehmann
 1931–1933: Adolf Gremmelspacher
 1933: Gutmann, temporary
 1933–1937: Hermann Schneider
 1937–1940: Karl Berckmüller
 1940–1945: Hermann Riedel
 1945–1946: Walter Bräunlich
 1946: Edwin Hartmann
 1946–1950: Edwin Nägele
 1950–1972: Severin Kern

Schwenningen
 1797–1816: Erhard Bürk
 1816–1819: (Vogt)
 1819–1821: Thomas Wegler
 1821–1825: ?
 1825–1835: Matthias Rapp
 1835–1841: Johann Georg Koch
 1841–1852: Andreas Bürk
 1852–1857: Christian Strohm
 1857–1887: Erhard Müller
 1887–1912: David Würth
 1912–1925: Emil Braunagel
 1925–1930: Ingo Lang von Langen
 1930–1948: Otto Gönnenwein
 1949–1962: Hans Kohler
 1962–1972: Gerhard Gebauer

Villingen-Schwenningen
 1972–1994: Gerhard Gebauer (SPD)
 1994–2002: Manfred Matusza (CDU)
 2002–2019: Rupert Kubon (SPD)
 since 2019: Jürgen Roth (CDU)

Population

Number of inhabitants

Source: State Statistical Office of Baden-Württemberg

Largest communities of foreigners

Main sights

 Town wall
 Municipal Art Gallery
 Franciscan Monastery Museum
 Schwenningen Clock Museum
 Minster of Our Lady
 Theater am Ring
 Wanne Observation Tower, one of the oldest towers built of iron
 Internationales Luftfahrt-Museum, aviation museum

Sports
Since 1904, Villingen-Schwenningen has also been home to the ice hockey team the Schwenninger Wild Wings, which competes in the Deutsche Eishockey Liga.

The town's football club is FC 08 Villingen, who in the 2021/22 season are competing in the Oberliga Baden-Württemberg at the fifth tier of the German league system.

Twin towns – sister cities

Villingen-Schwenningen is twinned with:

 Pontarlier, France
 La Valette du Var, France
 Tula, Russia
 Savona, Italy
 Zittau, Germany
 Friedrichsthal, Germany

Notable people

Georg Pictorius (c. 1500–1569), physician and mystic-magical author of the Renaissance
Trudpert Neugart (1742–1825), professor of oriental languages
Johannes Benzing (1913–2001), Turkologist and diplomat
Martin Barner (1921–2020), mathematician
Kurt Leichtweiss (1927–2013), mathematician
Hartmann von der Tann (born 1943), journalist
Horst Ludwig Meyer (1956–1999), presumed member of the Red Army Faction (RAF)
Veit Heinichen (born 1957), writer
Gundolf Köhler (1959–1980), right-wing extremist
Andreas K. Engel (born 1961), brain researcher
Markus Kemmelmeier (born 1967), social psychologist and sociologist
Robert Prosinečki (born 1969), Croatian footballer and coach
Michelle (born 1972), singer
Thorsten Schmitt (born 1975), Nordic combiner
Oliver Roggisch (born 1978), handball player
Martin Schmitt (born 1978), ski jumper
Andreas Lang (born 1979), curler
Dennis Seidenberg (born 1981), ice hockey player
Ivana Brkljačić (born 1983), Croatian hammer thrower
Jochen Schöps (born 1983), volleyball player
Marco Caligiuri (born 1984), German-Italian footballer
Yannic Seidenberg (born 1984), ice hockey player
Adem Sarı (born 1985), Turkish footballer
Daniel Caligiuri (born 1988), German-Italian footballer
Florian Rudy (born 1989), footballer
Sebastian Rudy (born 1990), footballer
Domenic Weinstein (born 1994), cyclist
Kai Wissmann (born 1996), ice hockey player

In 2004 the former Bosnian boxer Armin „Boki“ Ćulum founded the motorcycle-like gang United Tribuns in Villingen-Schwenningen. The gang owned two bordellos and had a great influence on the prostitution scene in Villingen-Schwenningen. The gang called itself a group of bodybuilders, martial art athletes and bouncers. The United Tribuns grew fast and led to rivalry with the Hells Angels and Bandidos. United Tribuns had chapters in München, Augsburg, Nürnberg and Ingolstadt, and from 2014 also in the north in Hannover and later in Osnabrück. In Austria there was a chapter in Linz, Klagenfurt and Vienna. In September 2022 the Federal Minister for the Interior (BMI) prohibited the gang; and their money was confiscated.

References

External links

 
Villingen-Schwenningen: history & pictures 
The siege of Villingen in 1702

Towns in Baden-Württemberg
Schwarzwald-Baar-Kreis
Populated places on the Neckar basin
Populated riverside places in Germany
 V